Chupan Chupai is a 2017 Pakistani comedy thriller film, directed by Mohsin Ali. The film stars Ahsan Khan, Neelam Muneer and Ali Rizvi in the lead cast. It released on 29 December 2017 under the banner of Huzu Productions, and was distributed by Hum Films. The film received generally positive reviews and became a commercial success at the box office, having grossed 7.00 crore.

The plot of Chupan Chupai is very loosely inspired by the 2013 Indian Tamil language film Soodhu Kavvum.

Plot
The film is about a comedy of trios revolving around three friends Feddy, Koki and Teli, stupid by nature and cursed by luck. Their lives take a chilling turn when they cross paths with Babu (Ahsan Khan) and his imaginary girlfriend, Pari. Together they knit a smart kidnapping plan to abduct someone wealthy and demand a huge ransom. This takes an unexpected turn when the son of a Minister ends up in their custody and the task to find the kidnappers is given to encounter specialist, Chaudhry. Babu and his gang try to stay ahead of the cop, leading from one comic situation to another.

Cast
Zayed Sheikh as Feddy
Vajdaan Shah as Teeli
Ali Rizvi as Koki
Ahsan Khan as Babu
Neelam Muneer as Pari
Faizan Khawaja as Babar Durrani (Bobby)
Sakina Samo as Babar's mother
Talat Hussain as Ijaz Durrani
Adnan Jaffar as Chaudhry (Policeman)
Rehan Sheikh as Khan
Javed Sheikh (special appearance)

Production
Chupan Chupai is directed by Mohsin Ali and it is his directorial debut. The cast of the film includes Ahsan Khan and Neelam Muneer in lead roles, alongside Ali Rizvi, Rehan Sheikh, Talat Hussain, Adnan Jaffar, Faizan Khawaja, Sakina Samo and Javed Sheikh in supporting roles. The film is the debut of the actresses Muneer and Samo. In an interview, Ahsan Khan said, "I read three different scripts before coming across and committing to Chupan Chupai. I enjoyed reading the script so much that i was sure I'd enjoy making the movie". Principal photography began in February 2016. The film cinematographer came from the United States to join the project. The studio for the film is Huzu Productions.

Soundtrack

The film soundtrack album was released by Hum Films on 8 December 2017.

Release
The trailer for the film was released on 23 November 2017. The film released across Pakistan on 29 December 2017.

Box office
The film was declared a hit at the box office.

Critical reception
Chupan Chupai had a premiere event in Karachi on Thursday, 28 December 2017, and it opened to mostly good reviews. Rahul Aijaz of The Express Tribune rated 3.25 stars out of 5 and he too praised it, "even with its loopholes, it has more than enough to keep you engaged (mostly hysterically laughing) and busy with several twists and turns." Mehreen Hasan of DAWN Images said, "These are minor gripes for an otherwise solid script that combined with powerful performances and cinematography made for a fun experience." Mohammad Kamran Jawaid of DAWN said that while "the screenplay and dialogue are all copy-pasted" from Soodhu Kavvum, a "good chunk of it is engaging within the bounds of mediocrity." Maria Shirazi of The News International also praised it, "A film only works if all elements come together in unison. Fortunately, Chupan Chupai gets many, if not all, elements right."

Manal Faheem Khan of Something Haute rated 4 out of 5 stars and praised, "We can't say what our favourite aspect of the film is, simply because there are so many." Arsalan Ali rated 3.5 stars out of 5, and wrote to website behtareen.pk that "Obviously, there are flaws," but "To his credit, director Mohsin Ali has done a fine job and proved that qualification does make a difference." Omair Alavi rated 3.5 stars out of 5; he along with Syeda Sarah Hasan of Samaa TV, Malika Khan of Geo News and Zahra Khan of Dunya News referred it as "a breath of fresh air" for the Pakistani cinema. Zaheer Ahmed of Samaa TV rated 2.5 stars out of 5 and praised the leading cast, while said that this movie could have been better, adding that a film would be successful if more focus is given to it to make people happy. Noor Ul Ain of Youlin Magazine noted, "All in all, the good, bad, ugly, entertaining are all parts played by men, while the women in Mohsin Ali's world are either silenced or sidelined, if not entirely excluded."

Accolades

See also
List of Pakistani films of 2017
List of Pakistani dramas

References

External links

2017 films
Pakistani comedy thriller films
2010s Urdu-language films
Pakistani remakes of Indian films
Hum films